Pamapuria is a locality in Northland, New Zealand. It lies on State Highway 1 about 10 km east of Kaitaia.

Demographics
The SA1 area is part of the larger Rangitihi statistical area.

The SA1 statistical area had a population of 174 at the 2018 New Zealand census, an increase of 39 people (28.9%) since the 2013 census, and an increase of 51 people (41.5%) since the 2006 census. There were 57 households, comprising 90 males and 87 females, giving a sex ratio of 1.03 males per female. The median age was 43.7 years (compared with 37.4 years nationally), with 36 people (20.7%) aged under 15 years, 27 (15.5%) aged 15 to 29, 81 (46.6%) aged 30 to 64, and 27 (15.5%) aged 65 or older.

Ethnicities were 46.6% European/Pākehā, 69.0% Māori, 1.7% Pacific peoples, 1.7% Asian, and 1.7% other ethnicities. People may identify with more than one ethnicity.

Of those people who chose to answer the census's question about religious affiliation, 29.3% had no religion, 44.8% were Christian, 13.8% had Māori religious beliefs and 3.4% had other religions.

Of those at least 15 years old, 15 (10.9%) people had a bachelor or higher degree, and 36 (26.1%) people had no formal qualifications. The median income was $22,300, compared with $31,800 nationally. 15 people (10.9%) earned over $70,000 compared to 17.2% nationally. The employment status of those at least 15 was that 66 (47.8%) people were employed full-time, 18 (13.0%) were part-time, and 9 (6.5%) were unemployed.

Rangitihi statistical area

Rangitihi had a population of 936 at the 2018 New Zealand census, an increase of 117 people (14.3%) since the 2013 census, and an increase of 126 people (15.6%) since the 2006 census. There were 330 households, comprising 474 males and 459 females, giving a sex ratio of 1.03 males per female. The median age was 43.2 years (compared with 37.4 years nationally), with 195 people (20.8%) aged under 15 years, 168 (17.9%) aged 15 to 29, 417 (44.6%) aged 30 to 64, and 156 (16.7%) aged 65 or older.

Ethnicities were 67.9% European/Pākehā, 49.0% Māori, 3.8% Pacific peoples, 2.2% Asian, and 1.3% other ethnicities. People may identify with more than one ethnicity.

The percentage of people born overseas was 9.0, compared with 27.1% nationally.

Of those people who chose to answer the census's question about religious affiliation, 37.5% had no religion, 45.5% were Christian, 6.7% had Māori religious beliefs and 2.2% had other religions.

Of those at least 15 years old, 84 (11.3%) people had a bachelor or higher degree, and 192 (25.9%) people had no formal qualifications. The median income was $24,300, compared with $31,800 nationally. 69 people (9.3%) earned over $70,000 compared to 17.2% nationally. The employment status of those at least 15 was that 351 (47.4%) people were employed full-time, 117 (15.8%) were part-time, and 39 (5.3%) were unemployed.

Education

In 2012, the school's deputy principal, James Parker, was arrested under, and pleaded guilty to, 49 charges of child molestation. As a result of Parker's arrest, the incumbent principal, Stephen Hovell, was dismissed from his position.

Notes

Far North District
Populated places in the Northland Region